Schayera is a monotypic genus of grasshopper in the tribe Catantopini from Tasmania.

Species is Schayera baiulus

References 

Acrididae genera
Taxonomy articles created by Polbot